Dustin Ransom (born December 5, 1986) is an American multi-instrumentalist, producer, vocalist, arranger, music transcriber, and film composer based in Nashville, Tennessee.  As a session and live musician, he has performed with artists including Ryan Bingham, Jars of Clay, Matt Maher, Andy Davis, Andrew Belle, Ben Rector, Steve Moakler, Laura Story, Brandon Heath, and Brooke Waggoner. As an arranger and transcriber, he has worked with music companies including Vic Firth, and Mel Bay. He is the co-founder of the Nashville Film Composers, an independent music library designed for use in films and television. He is also the founder of the Nashville Drummers Project, an interview blog spotlighting professional drummers in the Nashville area.

Biography 
Born in Evansville, Indiana, Ransom was raised in Boonville, Indiana.  At age three, he began taking piano lessons, which he continued until his junior year of college.  He also began playing drums from an early age, received his first drum set at age eight, then began taking lessons at age eleven until he graduated from college.  At the age of eleven, he began teaching himself guitar and bass.

In 2005, he moved to Nashville, Tennessee to pursue a Bachelor of Music in Commercial Percussion, or drum set, at Belmont University.  He studied drum set with Chester Thompson, Zoro, and Todd London, classical percussion with Dr. Chris Norton and Todd Kemp, and jazz piano with Bruce Dudley and Steve Willets.  He graduated in 2009.

Selected recordings 
 The Ransoms – Begin at the End (2008): drums, electric guitar, piano, Wurlitzer
 Andrew Belle – The Ladder (2009): drums
 Andrew Combs – Tennessee Time (2010): piano, organ, Rhodes
 Nashville Film Composers – Nashville Film Composers (2010): producer, engineer, composer, vocals, drums, tambourine, shaker, glockenspiel, piano, Rhodes, organ, melodica, celeste, electric and upright bass, electric guitar, acoustic guitar, mandolin, synthesizers, handclaps, footstomps, arranging
 Chad Jarnagin – Chad Jarnagin (2011): Rhodes, organ, treated piano, percussion, background vocals

References

1986 births
Living people
Musicians from Evansville, Indiana
American multi-instrumentalists
American film score composers
American male film score composers
Record producers from Indiana
People from Boonville, Indiana